Meri Cetinić (born 15 June 1953) is a Croatian pop singer and soprano vocalist.

Cetinić was born in Split and graduated at the Teachers Academy of the University of Split. Her first major contribution was the song "More" (lit. "the Sea") with the band Grupa More in 1973.

Between the 1970s and the 1990s, she released 12 albums under major Yugoslav and Croatian record labels, some of which went gold and platinum.

References

External links
 

1953 births
Croatian pop singers
20th-century Croatian women singers
Living people
Musicians from Split, Croatia